Kyle Jacobs (born 14 June 1991) is a South African professional soccer player who plays as a midfielder for Edinburgh. Jacobs has previously played for Livingston, Kilmarnock, Queen of the South and Greenock Morton.

Career

Livingston
After progressing through the youth system at Livingston, Jacobs made his first-team debut as a second-half substitute versus Dundee on 21 February 2009. He appeared in 97 league matches for Livingston before he left the club at the end of the 2012–13 season.

Kilmarnock
At the age of 22, Jacobs signed a six-month contract with Kilmarnock in August 2013. After making five league appearances, he was released by Kilmarnock in January 2014. Jacobs then returned to Livingston on an eighteen-month contract later that month.

Queen of the South
Jacobs signed for Queens at the start of the 2015-16 season. In February 2017, Jacobs signed a two-year contract extension until May 2019.

Greenock Morton
On 23 May 2019, Jacobs signed a pre-contract with Greenock Morton on a one-year deal.

Personal life
On 13 July 2018, Jacobs' wife Chloe safely delivered a daughter named Lily as they became parents for the first time.

Jacobs' brother Keaghan plays for Arbroath and Kyle himself is one of seven siblings and is a triplet alongside Devon and Sheldon.

Career statistics

Honours
Livingston
Scottish Third Division: 2009–10
Scottish Second Division: 2010–11
Scottish Challenge Cup: 2014–15

References

External links

1991 births
Living people
South African expatriate sportspeople in Scotland
South African soccer players
Scottish Football League players
Scottish Professional Football League players
Livingston F.C. players
Kilmarnock F.C. players
Association football midfielders
Soccer players from Johannesburg
Expatriate footballers in Scotland
White South African people
Queen of the South F.C. players
Triplets
Greenock Morton F.C. players
Twin sportspeople
South African twins
F.C. Edinburgh players
South African expatriate soccer players